Bell Witch is an American doom metal band from Seattle, Washington, formed in 2010. The group has no lead guitarist.

History
Bell Witch was formed in 2010 by Dylan Desmond and Adrian Guerra. In 2011, the group created a four-track demo that was released through a number of small record labels. With the success of that release, Bell Witch went on to create their first two studio albums, Longing (2012) and Four Phantoms (2015). In 2016, drummer and co-founding member Adrian Guerra died, shortly after being replaced by Jesse Shreibman on drums. 

Less than a year later, Bell Witch released their third album, Mirror Reaper (2017), to critical acclaim. The album features vocals from Guerra that had been left over from the Four Phantoms sessions and acts as a tribute to him. Notably, Mirror Reaper comprises one 84-minute song of the same name. Mirror Reaper received significant national coverage, appearing on a number of year-end lists.

After performing vocals in the second half of Mirror Reaper, Erik Moggridge of Aerial Ruin collaborated with Bell Witch on their fourth album, Stygian Bough Volume 1 (2020).

Members
Current members
 Dylan Desmond – vocals, bass (2010–present)
 Jesse Shreibman – drums, vocals (2016–present)

Former members
 Adrian Guerra – drums, vocals (2010–2016; died 2016)

Discography
Studio albums
 Longing (Profound Lore Records, 2012)
 Four Phantoms (Profound Lore Records, 2015)
 Mirror Reaper (Profound Lore Records, 2017)
 Stygian Bough Volume 1 (with Aerial Ruin; Profound Lore Records, 2020)

Other releases
 Demo 2011 (various labels, 2011)

References

External links
 Bell Witch on Discogs
 Bell Witch on Bandcamp

American doom metal musical groups
2010 establishments in Washington (state)
Heavy metal musical groups from Washington (state)
Musical groups from Seattle
Musical groups established in 2010
Profound Lore Records artists
Heavy metal duos